Lists of automobiles by performance cover the performance of production cars based on factors such as acceleration, maximum speed, or power output.

Lists
List of fastest production cars by acceleration
Production car speed record
List of production cars by power output